Sutomo (3 October 1920 – 7 October 1981), also known as Bung Tomo (meaning Comrade or Brother Tomo), is best known for his role as an Indonesian military leader during the Indonesian National Revolution against the United Kingdom and the Netherlands. He played a central role in Battle of Surabaya when the British attacked the city in October and November 1945.

Early life 

Sutomo was born in Kampung Blauran in the centre of Surabaya to a clerk father, Kartawan Tjiptowidjojo, and mother of mixed Javanese, Sundanese and Madurese descent. He had received Dutch secondary education before the Japanese occupation.

Alongside menial jobs, he joined the Indonesian Scouting organisation and at the age of seventeen as the second Pramuka Garuda; a rank achieved by only three Indonesians before the Japanese occupation during World War II.

Japanese occupation
During the Japanese occupation period, Sutomo was worked for the Dōmei Tsushin (the official news agency of the Empire of Japan) in Surabaya. He became famous by setting up  (Resistance Radio), which promoted unity and fighting spirit among  (Indonesian youth).

Indonesian National Revolution

Indonesian People's Revolutionary Front
In 12 October 1945, Sutomo founded and become a leader of Indonesian People's Revolutionary Front, abbreviated as BPRI, is an Indonesian militia, with its headquarters in Surabaya. 
BPRI was aimed at realizing and defending the Proclamation of Indonesian Independence, they rallied the people's resistance against the Dutch who wanted to reign Indonesia after the Surrender of Japan in World War II.

During the Netherlands Indies Civil Administration (NICA) occupation, in the early stages of the Indonesian National Revolution, in the Bersiap period, Sutomo encouraged atrocities against Indonesians of mixed European–Asian ancestry and personally supervised the summary executions of hundreds of civilians. These are archived eye witness testimony of the events of 22 October 1945.

Battle of Surabaya
He played a central role when the battle broke out in Surabaya between Indonesian nationalists and Anglo-Indian forces. Although the fighting ended in defeat for the Indonesians, the battle served to galvanise Indonesian and international opinion in support of the independence cause. Sutomo spurred thousands of Indonesians to action with his distinctive, emotional speaking-style of his radio broadcasts. His "clear, burning eyes, that penetrating, slightly nasal voice, or that hair-raising oratorical style that second only to Sukarno's in its emotional power".

10 November 1945, the peak of the Battle of Surabaya, was later known as Hari Pahlawan (Heroes’ Day), to commemorate and honor the struggles of heroes and fighters in defending Indonesian independence.

The battle for Surabaya was the bloodiest single engagement of the war, and demonstrated the determination of the rag-tag nationalist forces; their sacrificial resistance became a symbol and rallying cry for the revolution. Later, in November 1946, the last British troops left Indonesia.

Post-independence 

In 1955, Sutomo become a minister of state in the Burhanuddin Harahap Cabinet between August 1955 and March 1956, an appointment which pleased cabinet supporters because of his nationalist credentials. However, his relationship with President Sukarno was already began to sour in 1952 after he offended the president by asking about the president's personal relationship with Hartini, a married woman whose later became Sukarno's fourth wife. Sutomo would later sued Sukarno in 1960, due to the president's decision to dissolve the People's Representative Council.

After the 1956, Sutomo emerged again as a national figure during the 1965 turbulent period. Initially, he supported Suharto to replace the left-leaning Sukarno government, but later opposed aspects of the New Order regime.

On 11 April 1978, he was detained by the government for his outspoken criticism of corruption and abuses of power; upon his release three years later, however, Sutomo continued to loudly voice his criticisms. He said that he did not want to be buried in the Heroes' Cemetery because it was full of "fairweather heroes" who had lacked the courage to defend the nation at times of crisis, but when peace came appeared in public to glorify their achievements.

Death 
On 7 October 1981, he died in Mecca, Saudi Arabia, while on Hajj pilgrimage. 
Before his death, Sutomo managed to finish a draft of his own dissertation on the role of religion in village-level development. 
His family and friends had his body returned to Indonesia. Although his reputation and military rank gave him the right to be buried in the Heroes' Cemetery, he was laid to rest in public burial ground at Ngagel, Surabaya, East Java.

Family
On 9 June 1947, Sutomo married Sulistina in Malang, East Java. He was known as a devoutly religious father of four who took religious knowledge seriously throughout his life.

See also 

 Battle of Surabaya
 Indonesian National Revolution
 History of Indonesia

References

Bibliography 
 
 
 

1920 births
1981 deaths
Indonesian Muslims
People from Surabaya
Indonesian military personnel
National Heroes of Indonesia
Scouting pioneers
Scouting in Indonesia
People of the Indonesian National Revolution